Blue Jays is a 1975 album by Justin Hayward and John Lodge. It was recorded and released during the Moody Blues' five-year hiatus.

During work on the Moody Blues album that was to follow Seventh Sojourn, bandmates Lodge, Mike Pinder, Ray Thomas and Graeme Edge summoned Hayward and producer Tony Clarke out of a recording session to call off the project. The tension-fraught recording of Seventh Sojourn and subsequent world tour had left the band exhausted and relationships frayed. Pinder, who had emigrated to the United States, was not happy in England and was determined to return home to California. According to Hayward:

I was under a lot of pressure from Decca to come up with something to release. So I actually went to America to do something with Mike [Pinder], between the two of us. Then Tony Clarke and John [Lodge] turned up at Mike's house as well. Mike took me in the other room and said, "I don't want to work with anybody else. I'm out of this project." So then it became me and John and Tony Clarke, and we made an album called Blue Jays.

The album was recorded in Threshold Westlake Audio Studios in West Hampstead, London.

On 10 March 1975 Blue Jays made its debut in the form of a staged playback of the album at Carnegie Hall. Hayward and Lodge wanted to pipe the music into the street, but New York police said they feared a traffic jam. A short tour of the UK followed in November and December 1975.  A recording of the 12 December show at Lancaster University, featuring Trapeze members Mel Galley (guitar) and Dave Holland (drums), is included in the 2013 Timeless Flight box set.

The track "Blue Guitar," originally released as a non-album single credited to Hayward and Lodge in September 1975 but performed by Hayward with the band 10cc, with John Lodge on bass guitar, was added to the album upon its re-release on CD in 1987. Hayward said, “After a couple of years, John and I had made the Blue Jays album and we were looking for something to release to promote it and I remembered this track and I brought it out and played it to John and our producer Tony Clark. They liked it but thought it needed something so we took it back to our studio and John added some bass onto it and Tony mixed it in a really nice way and anyone who’s interested will notice it’s got dual production credits of 10cc and Tony Clark.”

In 2004, the album was remastered and released on CD with the same bonus track.

Original track listing

Side One 
 "This Morning" (Justin Hayward) - 5:56
 "Remember Me (My Friend)" (Hayward, John Lodge) - 5:28
 "My Brother" (Hayward) - 3:28
 "You" (Lodge) - 4:35
 "Nights Winters Years" (Hayward) - 3:40

Side Two 
 "Saved by the Music" (Lodge) - 6:09
 "I Dreamed Last Night" (Hayward) - 4:29
 "Who Are You Now" (Hayward) - 2:29
 "Maybe" (Lodge) - 5:38
 "When You Wake Up" (Hayward, Lodge) - 5:23

1987 Bonus track (also 2004 remastered release) 
<LI> "Blue Guitar" (Hayward) - 3:37

Personnel 
 Justin Hayward – guitar, vocals
 John Lodge – bass, guitar, vocals, pipe organ on "Maybe"
 Jim Cockey – violin, French horn
 Tim Tompkins – cello
 Tom Tompkins – viola
 Kirk Duncan – piano
 Graham Deakin – drums

"Blue Guitar" 
 Justin Hayward - guitar, lead vocals
 Lol Creme - slide guitar, vocals
 Kevin Godley - drums, vocals
 Eric Stewart - guitar, vocals
 John Lodge - bass

Charts

Certifications

References 

1975 albums
Justin Hayward albums
John Lodge (musician) albums
Threshold Records albums
Albums produced by Tony Clarke (producer)